Les Johnson (10 February 1917 – 3 June 1994) was an Australian rules footballer who played with Footscray in the Victorian Football League (VFL).

Notes

External links 
		

1917 births
1994 deaths
Australian rules footballers from Victoria (Australia)
Western Bulldogs players